The fifth season of Laverne & Shirley, an American television sitcom series, began airing on September 13, 1979 on ABC. The season concluded on May 13, 1980 after 26 episodes.

The season aired Thursdays at 8:00-8:30 pm (EST), Mondays at 8:00-8:30 pm (EST) and Tuesdays at 8:30-9:00 pm (EST). The entire season was released on DVD in North America on April 10, 2012.

Overview
The series revolves around the titular characters Laverne DeFazio and Shirley Feeney, bottle-cappers at Shotz Brewery in early 1960s Milwaukee, Wisconsin. Episode plots include their adventures with neighbors and friends, Lenny and Squiggy.

Cast

Starring
Penny Marshall as Laverne DeFazio
Cindy Williams as Shirley Feeney
Michael McKean as Leonard "Lenny" Kosnowski
David Lander as Andrew "Squiggy" Squiggman
Phil Foster as Frank DeFazio
Eddie Mekka as Carmine Ragusa
Betty Garrett as Edna Babish

Guest Starring
Ron Howard as Richie Cunningham
Henry Winkler as Arthur "Fonzie" Fonzarelli
Susan Kellermann as Bambi
Ed Begley Jr. as Robert "Bobby" Feeney, Shirley's brother
Michelle Greene as Vicki
Elizabeth Daily as Rita
Art Garfunkel as "The Mighty Oak"
Ted Danson as Randy Carpenter
Roger C. Carmel as The Waiter
Scatman Crothers as Porter
Wilfrid Hyde-White as Colonel Kalaback
Conrad Janis as The Conductor
Vicki Lawrence as Sergeant Alvinia T. Plout
Ed Marinaro as Antonio DeFazio, Laverne's cousin

Episodes

References

Laverne & Shirley seasons
1979 American television seasons
1980 American television seasons